Yanis Youcef (born 2 October 1989 in Istres, France) is a French-born Algerian footballer who currently plays as a midfielder for US Marignane.

Career 
As a youth player Youcef played in France for Istres Rassuen, Martigues, Gueugnon and Monaco.

References

External links 

Profile at Dzfoot.com

1989 births
Living people
Algerian footballers
CF Pobla de Mafumet footballers
Gimnàstic de Tarragona footballers
USM Blida players
MC Alger players
USM El Harrach players
PFC Chernomorets Burgas players
Algerian Ligue Professionnelle 1 players
First Professional Football League (Bulgaria) players
Expatriate footballers in Bulgaria
Expatriate footballers in Spain
Algerian expatriate sportspeople in Bulgaria
Algerian expatriate sportspeople in Spain
Association football midfielders
21st-century Algerian people